Lake Elizabeth or Elizabeth Lake may refer to
Elizabeth Lake (Los Angeles County, California), a large lake near Palmdale, California (U.S.)
Lake Elizabeth (Fremont, California), a lake in Northern California 
Lake Elizabeth (Kandiyohi County, Minnesota)
Lake Elizabeth Township, Minnesota, a town in Minnesota (U.S.)
Lake Elizabeth (Florida)
Elizabeth Lake (Glacier County, Montana), a lake in Glacier National Park
Elizabeth Lake (Yosemite National Park), a lake in Yosemite National Park
Elizabeth Lake (Wisconsin and Illinois), a lake in Kenosha County, Wisconsin and McHenry County, Illinois

People 
 Elizabeth Lake, the pen name of British novelist Inez Pearn